Pier Paolo Varotti (1686- 1732) was an Italian painter, active depicting sacred and historical subjects in a late-Baroque or Rococo style.

Biography
He was born in Bologna (1686-1732), and became a follower of Giuseppe Maria Crespi. Pier Paolo helped decorate the church of Santi Filippo e Giacomo. His son Giuseppe Varotti was also a painter.

References

1686 births
1732 deaths
18th-century Italian painters
Italian male painters
Italian Baroque painters
Painters from Bologna
18th-century Italian male artists